Rhodes Hambridge (1913-1993) was an Australian born male rower who competed for England.

Rowing career
Hambridge represented England and won a gold medal in the eights at the 1938 British Empire Games in Sydney, New South Wales, Australia.

Personal life
He was an physician by trade. He lived in Teesdale Avenue, Isleworth and was a medical student at the time of the 1938 Games.

References

1913 births
1993 deaths
English male rowers
Rowers at the 1938 British Empire Games
Commonwealth Games medallists in rowing
Commonwealth Games gold medallists for England
Australian emigrants to the United Kingdom
Medallists at the 1938 British Empire Games